The Swan 41 was a boat designed by Sparkman & Stephens and built by Nautor's Swan. It was first launched in 1974.

External links
 Nautor Swan

References

Sailing yachts
Keelboats
1980s sailboat type designs
Sailboat types built by Nautor Swan
Sailboat type designs by Sparkman and Stephens
Sailboat type designs by Olin Stephens